Cyperus phleoides is a species of sedge that is native to parts of Hawaii.

See also 
 List of Cyperus species

References 

phleoides
Plants described in 1867
Flora of Hawaii
Taxa named by Horace Mann Jr.